Purjetaja was 1989–1995 a newspaper published in Estonia.

References

Newspapers published in Estonia
Defunct newspapers published in Estonia
Sailing in Estonia